The Smith & Wesson Model 27 is a six-shot, double-action revolver chambered for the .357 Magnum cartridge and manufactured by the United States company Smith & Wesson. It was first produced in 1935, and many versions of it are still in production today. The Model 27 was built on S&W's carbon steel, large N-frame, had adjustable sights, and was available at various times with 3", 4", 5", 6", 6", 8", 8", or 10" barrel lengths.

History
When first introduced by Smith & Wesson in 1935, it was known as the Registered Magnum. The model was essentially a custom-order revolver. Barrel lengths could be had in  increments from  inches in length. In addition to the different lengths of barrels available, there were different grips, front sights, triggers, hammers, and finishes available. Each Registered Magnum came with a certificate of authenticity.

Even though it was introduced in the middle of the Great Depression and was extremely expensive, Smith & Wesson found itself backlogged with orders for the four years that it produced the Registered Magnum. The Kansas City Police Department issued the Registered Magnum to its officers, and many other law enforcement officers across the United States carried the Registered Magnum. In 1939, Smith & Wesson stopped producing the Registered Magnum. It has been reported that these were the most popular barrel lengths for the Registered Magnum. Essentially, the Model 27 was still the Registered Magnum, but standardized for ease of production and economy. The Smith & Wesson Model 28 "Highway Patrolman" was introduced as a lower-cost version of the Model 27 in 1954, stripped of some of the features of the Model 27, such as polishing.

It was noted for its durability and reliability. The 3-inch barrel length was extremely popular with FBI agents from the 1940s through the 1970s. Skeeter Skelton considered the Model 27 with a 5-inch barrel as the best all-around handgun. General George Patton carried an ivory-handled Registered Magnum with a 3-inch barrel (along with his ivory-handled Colt Peacemaker); Patton called the Model 27 his "killing gun".

Variants

The stainless steel Model 627 was introduced in 1989 as the "Model of 1989". It featured a -inch barrel, a 6-shot unfluted cylinder, and had a round butt with S&W Combat stocks.

In 1996, the Smith & Wesson Performance Center began production of an 8-shot 627. The 627 has a  barrel with no muzzle brake or ports. The cylinder is unfluted. The revolver is made of stainless steel, with a matte finish and wood grips.

Model 327
In 2008, the eight-shot, scandium-framed Smith & Wesson Model 327 was introduced. A variant of the 327, the 327NG, is part of the NightGuard line.

The Smith & Wesson Model 327PD is an 8-shot double-action revolver that has a 4-inch stainless steel barrel with no muzzle brake or ports. It has a scandium alloy frame and a titanium cylinder. It comes with rosewood Hogue grips. It uses a light-gathering HI-VIZ front sight and an adjustable V-notch rear sight. The revolver finish is a glare-reducing matte black, with a matte gray cylinder.

The S&W TRR8 and M&P R8 (both including accessory rails for mounting lights and lasers) are recent advances of the 327 line.

Current production

Smith and Wesson now include the Model 27 in two variations in their current "Classics" Line of Revolvers. Both feature original style Wooden Combat Grips per the Post WW2 versions of the 27 and later 586 and 686 revolvers. Barrels are currently available in 4" and ", they both feature adjustable sights. The 4" version has a Pinned Serrated Ramp Style Front sight, the " version has a Traditional Target Patridge Style front sight that is also pinned to the barrel.

References

 

Smith & Wesson revolvers
.357 Magnum firearms
Revolvers of the United States
Police weapons